The 2020 Tour de Pologne was the 77th running of the Tour de Pologne road cycling stage race. It started on 5 August in the Silesian Stadium, on the first anniversary of the death of Belgian rider Bjorg Lambrecht in the last edition of the race, and ended on 9 August in Kraków, after five stages. The tour was initially due to run from 5 to 11 July, but was postponed due to the COVID-19 pandemic. In memory of Lambrecht, the dossard number 143, which he wore in 2019, was retired from the race beginning this year.

Evenepoel dedicated his win to teammate Fabio Jakobsen, who had crashed on stage 1 and suffered several severe injuries. In winning the race at 20 years and 197 days old, Evenepoel became the third youngest winner, and second youngest distinct winner, of the Tour de Pologne after Dariusz Baranowski, who won the 1991 and 1992 editions of the race at 19 and 20 years of age, respectively.

Teams
All nineteen UCI WorldTeams, two wildcard UCI ProTeams, and the Polish national team participated in the race. Each of the twenty-two teams entered seven riders, for a starting peloton of 154 riders. Of these riders, 138 finished the race.

UCI WorldTeams

 
 
 
 
 
 
 
 
 
 
 
 
 
 
 
 
 
 
 

UCI ProTeams

 
 

National Teams

 Poland

Schedule

Stages

Stage 1
5 August 2020 – Stadion Śląski, Chorzów to Katowice, 

The result for each of the three intermediate sprints was the same, with Paterski winning all of them, followed by Małecki in second and van den Berg in third; this meant that Paterski would be the first wearer of the blue jersey as the leader of the active rider classification. Later in the race, Małecki won the first KOM point in the first lap of the finishing circuit, and van den Berg would take the second KOM point before the breakaway was brought back with around 20 kilometers to go.

The most notable of these crashes was a high-speed crash on the downhill sprint finish. This caused Jakobsen to crash into and through the barriers, somersaulting and colliding with a race official sitting near the finish line. Groenewegen himself crashed as well, just after he crossed the finishing line when a flying section of barrier caught his back wheel. After the stage, the race jury decided to disqualify Groenewegen for his actions, thus expelling him from the race and expunging him of the win, which went to Jakobsen. Furthermore, the UCI fined Groenewegen 500 Swiss francs for violating UCI rules. In November 2020, Groenewegen was handed a nine-month ban for causing the crash, backdated to the day of the incident.

The race official was reported to only have suffered a head injury and was in stable condition. The race doctor reported that Jakobsen had suffered several major injuries, including serious brain trauma and damage to the upper respiratory tract, a broken palate, and heavy blood loss, and remained in life-threatening condition. Later in the day, Jakobsen's condition was described as stable, but he remained in a medically induced coma awaiting further surgeries.

Stage 2
6 August 2020 – Opole to Zabrze, 

Overnight, Jakobsen underwent intensive facial surgery, and doctors brought him out of the coma later in the day, reporting that he was "awake and in good condition." They elaborated, saying that "the extent of his injuries are such that his recovery process is expected to be 'long and arduous,'" but he was able to move his arms and legs and communicate with doctors. None of Jakobsen's vital organs were hit and major neurological problems were ruled out.

As a result of the injuries sustained in the previous day's crashes, Jakobsen, Prades, Sarreau, and Touzé did not start stage 2. Due to Jakobsen's and Sarreau's abandonments, Kamil Małecki, the best placed rider to start the stage, wore the yellow jersey.

The day's breakway was made up of two riders from the previous day's breakaway: Maciej Paterski and Julius van den Berg, who were the leaders of the active rider and mountains classifications, respectively. To add to their respective leads, Paterski won both intermediate sprints, while van den Berg won the KOM points on the only categorized climb of the day. With around 16 kilometers to go, the duo were caught by the peloton.

Current road world champion Mads Pedersen of  took his first win in the rainbow jersey, as the Danish rider sprinted early and managed to hold off 's Pascal Ackermann and 's Davide Ballerini at the line.

Stage 3
7 August 2020 – Wadowice to Bielsko-Biała, 

On the uphill sprint finish, Ecuadorian rider Richard Carapaz of  managed to catch everyone by surprise when he attacked with around 350 meters to go and managed to create enough separation from the peloton to hold on for the win, with Italian rider Diego Ulissi of  nearly catching Carapaz at the line to claim second. Commentators remarked that his effort was reminiscent of the one that Carapaz pulled when he won Stage 4 of the 2019 Giro d'Italia.

Stage 4
8 August 2020 – Terma Bukowina Tatrzańska to Bukowina Tatrzańska, 

These five riders took all the points on offer at each of the first five KOM points, and Patryk Stosz was able to move into the lead of the mountains classification at the end of the day with the points he got. With around 62 kilometers to go, Haas and Stosz were dropped from the group, and a few kilometers later, the peloton caught up the rest of the breakaway.

With 51 kilometers to go, 20-year-old Belgian rider Remco Evenepoel of  managed to break and stay away for a solo victory. As he crossed the line, he dedicated his win to recovering teammate Fabio Jakobsen and held up a "75" bib number which Jakobsen wore. Richard Carapaz, who was wearing the leader's yellow jersey, crashed earlier in the stage and struggled, finishing over three minutes behind Evenepoel and, as a result, dropped out of the top ten. Interestingly, the results of the stage meant that, for the fourth day in a row, new riders led the general, sprints, and mountains classifications.

Stage 5
9 August 2020 – Zakopane to Kraków, 

The original breakaway of the day contained four riders. Kasperkiewicz, who had won both of the KOM sprints since he joined the breakaway, was the first to be dropped from it.

Classification leadership table

 On stage two, Kamil Małecki, who was third in the general classification, wore the yellow jersey, because first placed Fabio Jakobsen and second placed Marc Sarreau did not start in stage two due to injuries.
 On stage two, Luka Mezgec, who was third in the sprints classification, wore the white jersey, because first placed Fabio Jakobsen and second placed Marc Sarreau did not start in stage two due to injuries.
 On stage two, Julius van den Berg, who was second in the mountains classification, wore the blue polkadot jersey, because first placed Kamil Małecki wore the yellow jersey as the best placed rider in the general classification that started stage two.

Classification standings

General classification

Sprints classification

Mountains classification

Active rider classification

Teams classification

Notes

References

External link

2020
2020 UCI World Tour
August 2020 sports events in Poland
Cycling events postponed due to the COVID-19 pandemic